The Turf Tavern (or just "the Turf") is a historic pub in central Oxford, England.  Its foundations and use as a malt house and drinking tavern date back to 1381.  The low-beamed front bar area was put in place sometime in the 17th century. It was originally called the Spotted Cow but the name was changed in 1842, likely as part of an effort to extinguish its reputation as a venue for illegal gambling activities.

The pub is frequented primarily by university students (of both Oxford University and Oxford Brookes University). It is located at the end of a narrow winding alley, St Helens Passage (originally Hell's passage), between Holywell Street and New College Lane, near the Bridge of Sighs. Running along one side of the pub is one of the remaining sections of the old city wall. Due to the illegal activities of many of its original patrons, the Turf sprang up in an area just outside the city wall in order to escape the jurisdiction of the governing bodies of the local colleges.

The Turf Tavern is also where future Australian Prime Minister Bob Hawke set a Guinness World Record for consuming a yard glass of ale in 11 seconds in 1954. Other public figures who have dined or drunk at the tavern include Richard Burton, Elizabeth Taylor, Tony Blair, CS Lewis, Stephen Hawking and Margaret Thatcher. It also served as a hangout for the cast and crew of the Harry Potter movies while the nearby colleges were used as locations throughout the filming of the series. The Turf Tavern also claims to be the location where future American president Bill Clinton, while a student at University College, Oxford as a Rhodes Scholar, famously smoked "but did not inhale" marijuana.

It was also featured in the ITV TV Series Inspector Morse aired between 1987 and 2000.

References

External links 

Bill Clinton
Pubs in Oxford